Re/oblivious is a remix mini-album by Kalafina, featuring the two original members Wakana and Keiko.

Track listing
Catalog Number: SECL-639
 
interlude 01
 
interlude 02

finale

Charts

References

2008 EPs
2008 remix albums
Kalafina albums
Remix EPs
Sony Music Entertainment Japan remix albums
Sony Music Entertainment Japan EPs
Japanese-language EPs

ja:Oblivious#Re/oblivious
pl:Oblivious#Re/oblivious
zh:Oblivious#Re/oblivious